Arūnas Bubnys (born November 7, 1961) is a Lithuanian historian and archivist. He started his studies at Vilnius University in 1985. In 1993 he received a Ph.D for the thesis Lietuvių antinacinė rezistencija 1941–1944 m.. 

From 1985 on he worked in the Lithuanian Institute of History. In 1993-1998 he was the director of Lithuanian Special Archives. Currently, he works at the Genocide and Resistance Research Centre of Lithuania and is a member of the International Commission for the Evaluation of the Crimes of the Nazi and Soviet Occupation Regimes in Lithuania.

Fields of interest 
 Nazi politics in occupied Lithuania
 Lithuanian resistance against Nazi
 Polish underground in Lithuania 1941-1944

Major works 
Lenkų pogrindis Lietuvoje 1939–1940 m., Vilnius, 1994. 
Lietuvių antinacinė rezistencija 1941–1944 m., Vilnius, 1991.
Vokiečių okupuota Lietuva (1941–1944), Vilnius, 1998.

References
Bio at Lithuanian Institute of History homepage
Holocaust in Lithuanian province in 1941

1961 births
20th-century Lithuanian historians
Historians of Lithuania
Living people
Vilnius University alumni
People from Ignalina
21st-century Lithuanian historians